Coleophora lepyropis is a moth of the family Coleophoridae. It is found in Pará, Brazil.

References

lepyropis
Moths described in 1921
Moths of South America